Kate Peck (born 1988) is an Australian model and television presenter.

Peck competed in the third season of Search for a Supermodel in 2002. She modelled for Myer from 2014 to 2015.

She works as a VJ on MTV and as a reporter on RPM on Ten Sport.

References

External links
 

Living people
1988 births
Australian female models
Models from Sydney
Participants in Australian reality television series
Reality modeling competition participants
Australian VJs (media personalities)
Australian television presenters
Australian women television presenters